Şilyan or Shil’yan may refer to:
Şilyan, Kurdamir, Azerbaijan
Şilyan, Yevlakh, Azerbaijan